Henry "Harry" Gifford (1884 – 1952) was an English professional rugby league footballer who played in the 1900s, 1910s and 1920s.

Background
Harry Gifford was born in Kirkby-in-Furness, Lancashire, England, and his death aged 67 was registered in Ulverston district, Lancashire, England.

Playing career

International honours
Harry Gifford won caps for England while at Barrow in 1908 against Wales, in 1909 against Australia (3 matches), and won caps for Great Britain while at Barrow in 1908-9 against Australia (2 matches).

County honours
Harry Gifford won caps for Lancashire while at Barrow.

Club career

Harry Gifford was transferred from Ulverston Hornets to Barrow during August 1901 for one guinea, i.e. one pound, and one shilling  (based on increases in average earnings, this would be approximately £400.10 in 2017), he played his last match for Barrow in the 4-52 defeat by Wigan at Central Park, Wigan on Saturday 21 October 1922.

Honoured at Barrow Raiders
Harry Gifford is a Barrow Raiders Hall of Fame inductee, his commemorative plaque is displayed in the Barrow Raiders boardroom.

References

External links
Barrow RL's Great Britons
Search for "Harry Gifford" at britishnewspaperarchive.co.uk
Search for "Henry Gifford" at britishnewspaperarchive.co.uk

1884 births
1952 deaths
Barrow Raiders players
England national rugby league team players
English rugby league players
Great Britain national rugby league team players
Lancashire rugby league team players
Rugby league players from Ulverston
Rugby league centres
Rugby league five-eighths
Rugby league forwards
Rugby league fullbacks
Rugby league halfbacks
Rugby league hookers
Rugby league locks
Rugby league players from Barrow-in-Furness
Rugby league props
Rugby league second-rows
Rugby league wingers
Rugby league utility players